The 2007 Mid-American Conference women's basketball tournament was the post-season basketball tournament for the Mid-American Conference (MAC) 2006–07 college basketball season. The 2007 tournament was held March 4–10, 2007. Regular season champion Bowling Green won their third straight championship over West Division winner Ball State. Carin Horne of Bowling Green was the MVP.

Format
The top two seeds in each division received byes into the quarterfinals. All rounds were held at Quicken Loans Arena.

Bracket

All-Tournament Team
Tournament MVP – Carin Horne, Bowling Green

References

Mid-American Conference women's basketball tournament
2006–07 Mid-American Conference women's basketball season
MAC women's basketball tournament
MAC women's basketball tournament
Basketball competitions in Cleveland
College basketball tournaments in Ohio
Women's sports in Ohio
2000s in Cleveland